Spaniblennius clandestinus is a species of combtooth blenny found in the eastern central Atlantic Ocean. It is known from a single specimen, the holotype, which was collected at Goree in Senegal

References

clandestinus
Taxa named by Hans Bath
Taxa named by Peter Wirtz
Fish described in 1989